Barnum is an unincorporated community located in the town of Haney, in Crawford County, Wisconsin, United States. Barnum is on the Kickapoo River north of Steuben and is served by Wisconsin Highway 131. The community was founded around 1892 by Edward S. Barnum from Bristol, Ontario County, New York, who purchased land along the Kickapoo River in 1857.

References

Unincorporated communities in Wisconsin
Unincorporated communities in Crawford County, Wisconsin